Rhodininae is a subfamily of marine polychaete worms in the family Maldanidae.

Description
Rhodininae worms are characterized by a lack of cephalic and pygidial plates, the presence of posteriorly directed collars in the posterior chaetigerous segments in at least one genus, a short low keel formed by the prostomium, acicular spines in notochaetae, absence of neurochaetae in a number of anterior chaetigers, presence of a double row of terebelloid uncini on some chaetigers, subrostral (i.e. below the rostrum) processes without barbules, an indeterminate number of chaetigers, and a conical pygidium.

Classification
The subfamily contains 3 genera and 10 species.
Rhodine  – 7 species
Boguea  – 2 species
Boguella  – 1 species

References

Polychaetes